William Asher Stevens (July 19, 1879 – March 9, 1941) was an American jurist and Republican Party politician who served as President of the New Jersey Senate and New Jersey Attorney General. As Attorney General he conducted the early phase of the state's investigation into the Lindbergh kidnapping.

Early life

Stevens was born in Stapleton Heights, Staten Island in 1879. In his youth he moved with his parents to Long Branch, New Jersey, where he graduated from Chattle High School in 1897 (since renamed as Long Branch High School). He studied at the State Normal School (now The College of New Jersey) in Trenton and then entered the law office of Public Utility Commission President John W. Slocum. He attended New York Law School, receiving a Bachelor of Laws degree in 1901, and was admitted to the New Jersey Bar the following year.

Career

In 1912, when Long Branch adopted the commission form of government, Stevens was named City Solicitor. He served until 1921, when he was appointed Monmouth County Solicitor.

His political career began in 1919 when he was elected to fill an unexpired term in the New Jersey Senate. He was re-elected to a full term in 1920 and again in 1923 and 1926. He was selected by his fellow Senate Republicans as floor leader in 1923. In 1928 he became President of the Senate, serving as Acting Governor while Governor A. Harry Moore was out of the state.

In 1929, Governor Morgan F. Larson appointed him to a five-year term as New Jersey Attorney General. When the Lindbergh kidnapping occurred in March 1932, Stevens took personal charge of the case, since Hunterdon County, where the crime took place, had no prosecutor at the time. This paved the way for Stevens' successor, David T. Wilentz, to lead the prosecution of Bruno Hauptmann in the 1935 trial.

While Attorney General Stevens also led the fight against pollution of New Jersey beaches by garbage dumped at sea. He succeeded in forcing New York authorities to dispose of garbage by incineration.

After his tenure as Attorney General he returned to Monmouth County to serve as solicitor for Deal, West Long Branch, Little Silver, and Rumson. He was also a partner in the law firm of Applegate, Stevens, Foster, & Reussille in Red Bank.

Stevens died in 1941 at the University of Pennsylvania Hospital in Philadelphia after undergoing a brain operation. He was 61.

References

1879 births
1941 deaths
Long Branch High School alumni
People from Stapleton Heights, Staten Island
Politicians from Long Branch, New Jersey
New York Law School alumni
New Jersey lawyers
Republican Party New Jersey state senators
Presidents of the New Jersey Senate
New Jersey Attorneys General
The College of New Jersey alumni